East Fortune railway station served the village of East Fortune, East Lothian, Scotland from 1848 to 1970 on the North British Railway Main Line.

History 
The station opened in July 1848 by the North British Railway. It was situated immediately east of East Fortune Hospital and on the northeast perimeter of the airfield. The station closed to passengers on 4 May 1964 and closed to goods on 14 September 1970.

References

External links 

Disused railway stations in East Lothian
Former North British Railway stations
Railway stations in Great Britain opened in 1849
Railway stations in Great Britain closed in 1964
1849 establishments in Scotland
1970 disestablishments in Scotland
Beeching closures in Scotland